The Multan Sultans (often abbreviated as MS) is a franchise cricket team which representing the city of Multan in southern Punjab in the Pakistan Super League (PSL). The team made its PSL debut in  2018 season.  The team is coach by Andy Flower, and remain under the captaincy of Mohammad Rizwan. The Sultans have previously lifted their maiden PSL title in 2021, making them the defending champions in 2022.

Administration and coaching staff

Squad 
Players with international caps are listed in bold
Ages are given as of the first match of the season, 27 January 2022

Season standings

Points table

Regular season

Playoffs

Qualifier

Final

References

External Links
 Team records in 2022 at ESPNcricinfo

2022 in Punjab, Pakistan
2022 Pakistan Super League
Sultans in 2022
2022